Lok Ningthou is the God associated with brooks, gorges, ravines, rills, rivulets, runnels and streams in Meitei mythology and religion of Ancient Kangleipak. He is the Guardian God of the Southern direction. He is a son of Wangpulen, the God of water.

Etymology 
In Meitei language (Manipuri language), the term "Lok" (ꯂꯣꯛ, /lok/) has multiple meanings. It means a gorge or a ravine.
"Lok" also means a brook or a rill or a rivulet or a runnel or a stream.
In Meitei language (Manipuri language), the term "Ningthou" (ꯅꯤꯡꯊꯧ, /niŋ.tʰəu/) means "king" or "ruler".

Description 
God Lok Ningthou is also given the title "Khana Chaoba" (or "Khana Chaopa") like his father Wangpulen (Wangbren). He is also known as "Noushuba Mihingchi". He is known for having seven children.

God Lok Ningthou is one of the Lainingthous. He is also one of the ten Maikei Ngaakpa Lais.

See also 
 Irai Leima
 Ngaleima

References

External links 

Abundance deities
Abundance gods
Earth deities
Earth gods
Fortune deities
Fortune gods
Guardians of the directions
Kings in Meitei mythology
Magic deities
Magic gods
Maintenance deities
Maintenance gods
Meitei deities
Mountain deities
Mountain gods
Names of God in Sanamahism
Nature deities
Nature gods
Ningthou
Peace deities
Peace gods
Sea and river deities
Sea and river gods
Time and fate deities
Time and fate gods
Water deities
Water gods